Faygate Station is located on the Arun Valley Line, between Littlehaven and Ifield,  down the line from , measured via Redhill. It serves the small village of Faygate and the Faygate Business Centre, situated on the A264 in the countryside between Crawley and Horsham.

History
The single track branch line of the London Brighton and South Coast Railway between Three Bridges and Horsham was opened 14 February 1848. Crawley and Faygate were intermediate stations each with two platforms to enable trains to pass. The line was doubled throughout during 1862 to coincide with the extension of the railway from Horsham to the Arun Valley.

Facilities
The station is unstaffed and facilities are limited. Tickets can be purchased from the self-service ticket machine and there are shelters and modern help points on both platforms. There is also a small car park at the station, operated by APCOA.

Step-free access is available to both the platforms at the station.

Services 
Services at Faygate are operated by Southern and Thameslink using  and  EMUs.

Services at the station are limited and run on weekdays only. Services run mostly during the peak hours with an additional service calling at around midday.

No services stop at the station on weekends.

Bus Connections
No regular buses directly serve the station although the Metrobus routes 23 and 200 stop at the Faygate roundabout, approximately 10 minutes walking distance from the station.

These services provide connections to Crawley, Gatwick Airport, Horsham and Worthing.

References

External links 

 Faygate - Least Used Station in West Sussex 2017 YouTube video by Geoff Marshall about the station.

Horsham District
Railway stations in West Sussex
Former London, Brighton and South Coast Railway stations
Railway stations in Great Britain opened in 1848
Railway stations served by Govia Thameslink Railway
1848 establishments in England